Peter Nicholls may refer to:

Peter Nicholls (artist) (1936–2021), New Zealand sculptor
Peter Nicholls (writer) (1939–2018), Australian literary scholar and critic
Peter Nicholls (musician) (born 1959), British musician

See also
Peter Nichols (disambiguation)